A crew is a group or class of people who work at a common activity.

Crew may also refer to:

Crew (comics), a Czech comic magazine published from 1997 to 2003
Crew (company), a technology company in Montreal, Canada
"Crew" (song), by GoldLink (2017)
Crew (surname), a surname and notable people with the name
Crew, County Londonderry, a townland in Northern Ireland
Crew cut, a type of haircut
Columbus Crew, an American Major League Soccer team from Columbus, Ohio
Crew rowing, a team sport

Abbreviations
Citizens for Responsibility and Ethics in Washington, U.S. government ethics and accountability watchdog organization
Commercial Real Estate Women, a professional association for women in real estate
 Concurrent Read Exclusive Write, an access model for parallel RAM in computers

See also
Crewe (disambiguation)
The Crew (disambiguation)
Crew's Hole, Bristol, an industrial area in east Bristol, England
Krewe, a group that puts on a parade or ball for Carnival